John Denver's Greatest Hits Volume 3 is a compilation album by American singer-songwriter John Denver, released in November 1984. "Love Again" and "The Gold and Beyond" were the new singles from this album.

Track listing
All tracks written by John Denver except "The Gold and Beyond" by Denver and Lee Holdridge.

References

John Denver compilation albums
1984 greatest hits albums
Albums produced by Milt Okun
RCA Records compilation albums